Kurzia is a genus of liverworts in the family Lepidoziaceae. It contains the following species (but this list may be incomplete). Kurzia crenacanthoidea G. Martens is a synonym of Kurzia gonyotricha (Sande Lac.) Grolle.

The leaves of typically have 3–6 lobes, often with smaller teeth at the sides of the lobes.

Species

Accepted species (57)
 Kurzia abbreviata Mizut.
 Kurzia abietinella (Herzog) Grolle
 Kurzia allisonii (Herzog) Grolle
 Kurzia amazonica (Spruce) Grolle
 Kurzia bisetula (Stephani) Grolle
 Kurzia borneensis Mizut.
 Kurzia brasiliensis (Stephani) Grolle
 Kurzia brevicalycina (Stephani) Grolle
 Kurzia calcarata (Stephani) Grolle
 Kurzia capillaris (Sw.) Grolle
 Kurzia compacta (Stephani) Grolle
 Kurzia cucullifolia (Stephani) R.M. Schust.
 Kurzia dendroides (Carrington & Pearson) Grolle
 Kurzia flagellifera (Stephani) Grolle
 Kurzia fragilifolia R.M. Schust.
 Kurzia fragillima (Herzog) Grolle
 Kurzia geniculata Mizut.
 Kurzia gonyotricha (Sande Lac.) Grolle
 Kurzia hainanensis D.K. Li & Z. K. Bai
 Kurzia hawaica (C.M. Cooke) Grolle
 Kurzia helophila R.M. Schust.
 Kurzia herzogiana (Steph.) R.M. Schust.
 Kurzia hippuroides (Hook. f. & Taylor) Grolle
 Kurzia hispida (Stephani) Grolle
 Kurzia insulana (W. Martin & E.A. Hodgs.) Grolle
 Kurzia irregularis (Stephani) Grolle
 Kurzia lateconica (Stephani) Grolle
 Kurzia lineariloba Mizut.
 Kurzia longicaulis Piippo
 Kurzia makinoana Grolle
 Kurzia mauiensis (H.A. Mill.) H.A. Mill.
 Kurzia mollis (Stephani) J.J. Engel & R.M. Schust.
 Kurzia moniliformis J.J. Engel
 Kurzia nemoides (Hook. f. & Taylor) Grolle
 Kurzia pallescens Grolle
 Kurzia pallida Piippo
 Kurzia pauciflora (Dicks.) Grolle
 Kurzia quadriseta Grolle
 Kurzia quinquespina J.J. Engel & G.L. Merr.
 Kurzia reversa (Carrington & Pearson) Grolle
 Kurzia saddlensis (Besch. & A. Massal.) Grolle
 Kurzia setacea (Weber) Grolle
 Kurzia setiformis (De Not.) J.J. Engel & R.M. Schust.
 Kurzia sexfida (Stephani) Grolle
 Kurzia sinensis G.C. Zhang; (Critically Endangered)
 Kurzia stephanii (Renauld) Grolle
 Kurzia sylvatica (A. Evans) Grolle
 Kurzia tabularis (Stephani) Grolle
 Kurzia tayloriana (H.A. Mill.) H.A. Mill.
 Kurzia temnomoides R.M. Schust.
 Kurzia tenax (Grev.) Grolle
 Kurzia tenerrima (Mitt. ex Stephani) Grolle
 Kurzia touwii N. Kitag
 Kurzia trichoclados (K. Müller) Grolle
 Kurzia uleana (Stephani) Grolle
 Kurzia verrucosa (Stephani) Grolle
 Kurzia verticellata (Carrington) Grolle
Unresolved:
 Kurzia succulenta Grolle

References

Jungermanniales genera
Lepidoziaceae
Taxonomy articles created by Polbot